The individual normal hill/10 km competition of the 2015 Winter Universiade was held at the Sporting Centre FIS Štrbské Pleso on January 26. It consisted of one jump from the normal hill and a 10 km cross-country race.

Results

Ski jumping

Cross-country

References 

Individual Normal Hill